Jazmin Truesdale (born December 6, 1987) is the writer and creator of AZA comics, a comic book that features diverse female characters.

Early life and education
Jazmin Truesdale was born in Durham, North Carolina. She earned a degree in exercise science from the University of North Carolina at Chapel Hill and an MBA from the Florida Institute of Technology.

Career and AZA comics
Truesdale is an entrepreneur and creator of Jazmin Fitness and AZA Comics, a comic book that features female characters of diverse backgrounds. Truesdale recruited illustrator Remero Colston for the project after finding him on Instagram. AZA Comics' first graphic novel, Keepers: Origins,  was published digitally in 2016.

References

Living people
American comics writers
People from Durham, North Carolina
University of North Carolina at Chapel Hill alumni
Florida Institute of Technology alumni
Female comics writers
1987 births